Iosif Ladislau Kalai  (born 2 December 1980) is a Romanian football player of Hungarian ethnicity. He currently plays for Liga IV side Inter Petrila as a defender. Kalai previously played for Jiul Petroşani, Politehnica Iaşi, FCM Bacău, Minerul Lupeni, Alro Slatina, Râmnicu Vâlcea, Arieșul Turda and Metalurgistul Cugir in the first three football leagues of Romania and for Retezatul Hațeg also in the 4th tier.

References

External links 
 
 

1980 births
Living people
People from Petroșani
Romanian footballers
Association football defenders
Liga I players
Liga II players
CSM Jiul Petroșani players
FC Politehnica Iași (1945) players
FCM Bacău players
CS Minerul Lupeni players
SCM Râmnicu Vâlcea players
ACS Sticla Arieșul Turda players